Einar Eugene Erlandsen (April 27, 1908March 24, 1995) was a Michigan politician.

Early life and education
Erlandsen was born on April 27, 1908 in Escanaba, Michigan to Norwegian parents. Erlandsen attended public school, and received a high school education in Escanaba.

Career
Erlandsen worked for 23 years as a paper maker for Escanaba Paper Company. He played a key role in organizing a credit union for the company in 1941, and served as the elected treasurer and manager of the credit union until 1948. On November 2, 1948, Erlandsen was elected to the Michigan House of Representatives where he represented the Delta County district from January 5, 1949 to December 31, 1964. On November 4, 1964, Erlandsen was again elected to the Michigan House of Representatives where he represented the 107th district from January 13, 1965 to December 31, 1966. Erlandsen was defeated when he sought re-election in 1966, and again in 1968. In 1956, Erlandsen was a delegate to the Democratic National Convention.

Personal life
Erlandsen married Rose M. McMahon on June 17, 1933. Together, they had one child. Erlandsen was Lutheran.

Death
Erlandsen died on March 24, 1995 in Escanaba. He was interred at Gardens of Rest Cemetery in Wells Township, Delta County, Michigan.

References

1908 births
1995 deaths
American Lutherans
American people of Norwegian descent
Burials in Michigan
Democratic Party members of the Michigan House of Representatives
Papermakers
People from Escanaba, Michigan
20th-century American politicians